Le Pen is  a Breton surname (meaning 'the head', 'the chief' or 'the peninsula').  Notable people with the name include:

 Le Pen family, the political family of France under patriarch Jean-Marie Le Pen
Jean-Marie Le Pen (born 1928), French politician, founder of the National Front party
Marine Le Pen (born 1968), French politician, daughter of Jean-Marie and leader of the National Rally party
Marion Maréchal-Le Pen (born 1989), French politician, granddaughter of Jean-Marie and niece of Marine
Maurice Jules-Marie Le Pen (1889-1919) French airplane designer, designer of the Levy-Le Pen
Ulrich Le Pen (born 1974), French football player

See also
Pen (disambiguation)

Surnames of Breton origin
Breton-language surnames